Crane Kenney is a Major League Baseball executive with the Chicago Cubs, serving as their President of Business Operations. He formerly served as chairman of the Cubs in 2010 and 2011.

References

External links

Living people
Chicago Cubs executives
Major League Baseball team presidents
Year of birth missing (living people)